Shipitsino is the name of several rural localities in Russia:
Shipitsino, Kochyovsky District, Perm Krai, a village in Kochyovsky District, Perm Krai
Shipitsino, Gaynsky District, Perm Krai, a village in Gaynsky District, Perm Krai